Tristan Davies is a British newspaper executive and former newspaper editor.

Davies was educated at Douai School in Woolhampton. He studied at the University of Bristol, then trained in radio journalism, but took employment for a London newspaper. He joined The Independent in 1986, soon after its launch. He initially worked on the listings section, then took various posts in arts and features. He left in the mid-1990s, to spend two years working on The Mail on Sundays Night & Day magazine.

Davies returned to The Independent in 1998, and became editor of the Independent on Sunday in 2001 in succession to Janet Street-Porter. In 2005, he oversaw a change in format from broadsheet to tabloid, while in June 2007, he oversaw a major redesign, which saw the paper reduced to a single section, plus a magazine. He remained editor until January 2008, becoming the longest-serving editor of the Independent on Sunday. The Guardian suggested that he had resigned as he was unhappy with budget cuts imposed on the newspaper.

In February 2008, Davies became executive editor of The Sunday Times with special responsibility for design, and was launch editor of the paper’s website and digital editions.

Davies rejoined The Mail on Sunday as assistant editor in 2012, and was appointed deputy editor in August 2016, taking office that September.

References

Year of birth missing (living people)
Living people
English newspaper editors
English male journalists
British newspaper executives
The Independent people
The Independent on Sunday editors